This transmission is part of a joint-venture between Ford Motor Company and General Motors to design and engineer two transmissions, a longitudinal 10-speed transmission and a transverse 9-speed trans-axle. Each company will manufacture its own unique version of the transmissions in their own factories. The 10-speed transmission was designed by Ford, while GM designed the 9-speed transmission which is used in transverse applications.

Specifications

Abstract
A unique triple-clutch assembly on a dedicated intermediate shaft, placed in the middle of the architecture, replaces two ordinary clutches and is the key for packaging the 10-speed unit into the same space as previous transmissions. The transmission provides small steps between each gear ratio, improving performance and maximizing engine power during acceleration. A wide gear ratio spread and a lower numerical top gear ratio reduces engine speed at vehicle highway speeds, resulting in improved efficiency.

Technical data

Applications

Ford

10R60
2020– Ford Explorer
2021– Ford Bronco

10R80–MHT
2020– Ford Explorer HEV
2020– Lincoln Aviator HEV

10R80
2017– Ford F-150
2018– Ford Mustang
2018– Ford Expedition
2018– Lincoln Navigator
2019– Ford Ranger
2019– Ford Everest
2020– Ford Transit
2020– Ford Endeavour
2023– VW Amarok

10R140
2020– Ford Super Duty

General Motors

10L80 MF6
2018– Chevrolet Suburban
2018– Cadillac Escalade
2018– Chevrolet Tahoe
2018– GMC Yukon Denali
2019– Chevrolet Camaro SS
2019– Chevrolet Silverado (Except V6 and I4-turbo models, which use the 6L80 and 8L90 respectively)
2019– GMC Sierra (Except V6 and I4-turbo models, which use 6L80 and 8L90)

10L90 MGL
2017– Chevrolet Camaro ZL1
2019– Cadillac CT6
2020– Cadillac CT5
2020– Cadillac CT4

10L1000 (Allison) MGM/MGU

2020– Chevrolet Silverado HD
2020– GMC Sierra HD

Production
The 10R80 was first produced at the Ford Livonia Transmission Plant in Livonia, Michigan, and the Hydra-Matic 10L80 is made at the General Motors Romulus Powertrain Plant, in Romulus, Michigan. GM's Silao, Mexico transmission plant started 10L80 production in 2018.  Ford's Sharonville Transmission plant started 10R80 production in 2018.

Notes

References

External links

How The 2017 Ford F-150's New 10-Speed Transmission Affects Fuel Economy

Automatic transmission tradenames
GM 10
GM 10